Harry Edward Boyes (17 March 1908 – 21 June 1979) was a South African cricketer who played a single first-class match for Natal during the 1929–30 season.

Boyes was the younger brother of George Wroughton Boyes, who also played first-class cricket for Natal. The brothers were both born in Maseru, in present-day Lesotho (formerly part of the British colony of Basutoland). They represent two of only a handful of first-class cricketers to be born in that country. Harry Boyes played his only match for Natal in December 1939, against Border in Queenstown. A middle-order batsman, he made five runs in the first innings and six in the second. Three other players – John Beveridge, Cecil Warner, and Murray Whitehead – were also making their first-class debuts in the match, which was part of 1929–30 season of the Currie Cup. Boyes died in Pietermaritzburg in 1979, aged 71.

Notes

References

1908 births
1979 deaths
KwaZulu-Natal cricketers
Lesotho cricketers
People from Maseru
South African cricketers
Lesotho emigrants to South Africa